The "Great Moon Hoax", also known as the "Great Moon Hoax of 1835", was a series of six articles published in The Sun, a New York newspaper, beginning on August 25, 1835, about the supposed discovery of life and even civilization on the Moon. The discoveries were falsely attributed to Sir John Herschel, one of the best-known astronomers of that time.

The story was advertised on August 21, 1835, as an upcoming feature allegedly reprinted from The Edinburgh Courant. The first in a series of six was published four days later on August 25.

Article

The headline read:

The articles described animals on the Moon, including bison, goats, unicorns, bipedal tail-less beavers and bat-like winged humanoids ("Vespertilio-homo") who built temples. There were trees, oceans and beaches. These discoveries were supposedly made with "an immense telescope of an entirely new principle".

"Vespertilio-homo" can be translated from Latin as man-bat, bat-man, or man-bats. A reprinted edition of 1836 added a second type named the Vespertiliones or the bat-men. The author of the narrative was ostensibly Dr. Andrew Grant, the travelling companion and amanuensis of Sir John Herschel, but Grant was fictitious.

Eventually, the authors announced that the observations had been terminated by the destruction of the telescope, by means of the Sun causing the lens to act as a "burning glass", setting fire to the observatory.

Authorship

Authorship of the article has been attributed to Richard Adams Locke (1800–1871), a reporter who, in August 1835, was working for The Sun. Locke publicly admitted to being the author in 1840, in a letter to the weekly paper New World. Still, rumours persisted that others were involved. Two other men have been noted in connection with the hoax: Jean-Nicolas Nicollet, a French astronomer travelling in America at the time (though he was in Mississippi, not New York, when the Moon-hoax issues appeared), and Lewis Gaylord Clark, editor of The Knickerbocker, a literary magazine. However, there is no good evidence to indicate that anyone but Locke was the author of the hoax.

Assuming that Richard A. Locke was the author, his intentions were probably, first, to create a sensational story which would increase sales of The Sun, and, second, to ridicule some of the more extravagant astronomical theories that had recently been published. For instance, in 1824, Franz von Paula Gruithuisen, professor of astronomy at Munich University, had published a paper titled "Discovery of Many Distinct Traces of Lunar Inhabitants, Especially of One of Their Colossal Buildings". Gruithuisen claimed to have observed various shades of color on the lunar surface, which he correlated with climate and vegetation zones. He also observed lines and geometrical shapes, which he felt indicated the existence of walls, roads, fortifications, and cities.

However, a more direct object of Locke's satire was Rev. Thomas Dick, who was known as "The Christian Philosopher" after the title of his first book. Dick had computed that the Solar System contained 21,891,974,404,480 (21.9 trillion) inhabitants. In fact, the Moon alone, by his count, would contain 4,200,000,000 inhabitants. His writings were enormously popular in the United States; intellectual Ralph Waldo Emerson was one of his fans.

Reactions

According to legend, The Suns circulation increased dramatically because of the hoax and remained permanently greater than before, thereby establishing The Sun as a successful paper. However, the degree to which the hoax increased the paper's circulation has certainly been exaggerated in popular accounts of the event. It was not discovered to be a hoax for several weeks after its publication and, even then, the newspaper did not issue a retraction.

Herschel was initially amused by the hoax, noting that his own real observations could never be as exciting. He later became annoyed when he had to answer questions from people who believed the hoax was serious.

Edgar Allan Poe claimed the story was a plagiarism of his earlier work "The Unparalleled Adventure of One Hans Pfaall".  His editor at the time was Richard Adams Locke.  He later published "The Balloon-Hoax" in the same newspaper.

Poe had published his own Moon hoax in late June 1835, two months before the similar Locke Moon hoax, in the Southern Literary Messenger entitled "Hans Phaall – A Tale", later republished as "The Unparalleled Adventure of One Hans Pfaall". The story was reprinted in the New York Transcript on September 2–5, 1835, under the headline "Lunar Discoveries, Extraordinary Aerial Voyage by Baron Hans Pfaall". Poe described a voyage to the Moon in a balloon, in which Pfaall lives for five years on the Moon with lunarians and sends back a lunarian to earth. The Poe Moon hoax was less successful because of the satiric and comical tone of the account. Locke was able to upstage Poe and to steal his thunder. In 1846, Poe would write a biographical sketch of Locke as part of his series "The Literati of New York City" which appeared in Godey's Lady's Book.

Legacy
Nate DiMeo's historical podcast The Memory Palace dedicated a 2010 episode to the Great Moon Hoax entitled "The Moon in the Sun".

The hoax inspired a three part musical by composer Matt Dahan as part of his musical radio series Pulp Musicals.

Richard Adams Locke and the Great Moon Hoax are fictionalized in chapter 14 of Félix J. Palma's 2012 novel "The Map of the Sky".

See also
 The Man in the Moone
 A Trip to the Moon, a 1902 French science fiction film in which the Moon is inhabited by insect-like aliens
 Lunarcy!
 A True Story, novel written by Lucian of Samosata featuring bizarre encounters on the Moon
 Moon landing conspiracy theories
 Life on Mars

References

Other sources 

 Evans, David S., "The Great Moon Hoax", Sky & Telescope, 196 (September 1981) and 308 (October 1981).
 Goodman, Matthew, The Sun and the Moon: The Remarkable True Account of Hoaxers, Showmen, Dueling Journalists, and Lunar Man-Bats in Nineteenth-Century New York (New York: Basic Books, 2008)

External links

 The Moon Hoax (1859 reprint) at Internet Archive
 The Moon Hoax eBook at Project Gutenberg
 "The Great Moon Hoax of 1835" by R. J. Brown at HistoryReference.org (archived 2016-02-24)
 "Episode 24: The Moon in the Sun"  (2010 podcast) at The Memory Palace 
 "The Great Moon Hoax of 1835" (after 2011) at The Museum of Hoaxes – with linked transcripts of the 6 newspaper articles
 "The Great Moon Hoax of 1835" (2011) at Victorian Gothic (archived 2017-06-30)
 "Richard Adams Locke" by Edgar Allan Poe – biographical essay from 1846 series The Literati of New York City
"Belief, Legend, and the Great Moon Hoax" (2014) at Library of Congress
 
 
 
 "The 'Great Moon Hoax' that fooled the world" (2022 podcast) at BBC Global News Ltd

Journalistic hoaxes
Hoaxes in science
Fiction set on the Moon
Moon myths
1835 in the United States
Hoaxes in the United States
19th-century hoaxes
August 1835 events
Written fiction presented as fact
Works involved in plagiarism controversies